[aka ] (Oaxaca 14 February 1894 – 1968) was a Mexican composer. He grew up in Oaxaca in a middle-class home. His alias  was a childhood nickname. In 1937, he debuted his music on XEW, Mexico City's best known radio station. In 1947, he was given his own radio program . He composed over two hundred songs.

Songs
 "Íntima". Text: Ricardo López Méndez (1903–1989)

References

1894 births
1968 deaths
People from Oaxaca
Mexican songwriters
Male songwriters
Mexican composers
Mexican male composers
20th-century male musicians